The 2019–20 season was MTK Budapest FC's 6th competitive season, 1st consecutive season in the Merkantil Bank Liga and 131st year in existence as a football club.

First team

Transfers

Summer

In:

Out:

Winter

In:

Out:

Nemzeti Bajnokság II

League table

Results summary

Results by round

Matches

Hungarian Cup

Statistics

Appearances and goals
Last updated on 26 May 2020.

|-
|colspan="14"|Youth players:

|-
|colspan="14"|Players no longer at the club:

|}

Top scorers
Includes all competitive matches. The list is sorted by shirt number when total goals are equal.
Last updated on 26 May 2020

Disciplinary record
Includes all competitive matches. Players with 1 card or more included only.

Last updated on 26 May 2020

Overall
{|class="wikitable"
|-
|Games played || 36 (27 Merkantil Bank Liga and 9 Hungarian Cup)
|-
|Games won || 25 (18 Merkantil Bank Liga and 7 Hungarian Cup)
|-
|Games drawn || 7 (5 Merkantil Bank Liga and 2 Hungarian Cup)
|-
|Games lost || 4 (4 Merkantil Bank Liga and 0 Hungarian Cup)
|-
|Goals scored || 74
|-
|Goals conceded || 33
|-
|Goal difference || +41
|-
|Yellow cards || 52
|-
|Red cards || 2
|-
|rowspan="2"|Worst discipline ||  Ákos Baki (4 , 1 )
|-
|  Máté Katona (6 , 0 )
|-
|rowspan="1"|Best result || 4–0 (A) v Dorog - Nemzeti Bajnokság II - 11-08-2019
|-
|rowspan="2"|Worst result || 0–2 (A) v Ajka - Nemzeti Bajnokság II - 23-02-2020
|-
| 1–3 (A) v Kazincbarcika - Nemzeti Bajnokság II - 08-03-2020
|-
|rowspan="1"|Most appearances ||  Máté Katona (35 appearances)
|-
|rowspan="1"|Top scorer ||  László Lencse (14 goals)
|-
|Points || 82/108 (75.92%)
|-

References

External links
 Official Website
 fixtures and results
 History and others

2019-20
Mtk Budapest